Sally Nugent (born 5 August 1971) is an English journalist, newsreader and television presenter. Since October 2021, she has presented BBC Breakfast along with Dan Walker, Naga Munchetty, Charlie Stayt and Jon Kay

Early life and education 
Nugent was born on 5 August 1971 on the Wirral Peninsula and was educated at Upton Hall School FCJ. She graduated with a Bachelor of Arts in Communication Arts and French from the University of Huddersfield.

Career 
Her first media role was at BBC Radio Merseyside before moving on to report on and read the sports news on BBC North West Tonight. In 2003 she became a sports reporter for BBC News, appearing on national bulletins, before becoming a sports news presenter on the BBC News Channel (known at the time as BBC News 24). There she travelled to Germany for the 2006 FIFA World Cup, anchoring Sportsday from there. Nugent then spent a period as a news correspondent on TV and radio, and as a relief presenter on the BBC News Channel.

In November 2011, Nugent began co-presenting BBC Breakfast on a freelance basis, filling in when regular hosts were unavailable. From April 2012 she presented sports bulletins alongside Mike Bushell on Breakfast following the programme's move to its new location at Media City in Salford. She established herself as one of the regular co-presenters of the Breakfast team after appearing on the Christmas Eve 2012 edition with Bill Turnbull, through to September 2021 reporting on Emma Raducanu's historic victory in the US Open tennis championship.

On 27 October 2021, it was announced that Nugent would become a permanent presenter of BBC Breakfast alongside Dan Walker, Charlie Stayt, and Naga Munchetty; she replaced Louise Minchin following Minchin's departure after 20 years on the programme.

Personal life 
Nugent is married with one child.

References

External links 
 

1971 births
Living people
People from the Metropolitan Borough of Wirral
Alumni of the University of Huddersfield
BBC newsreaders and journalists
BBC North West newsreaders and journalists